Periconodon is a genus of adapiform primate that lived in western Europe during the early middle Eocene.

References

Literature cited

 

Prehistoric strepsirrhines
Eocene primates
Prehistoric mammals of Europe
Prehistoric primate genera
Fossil taxa described in 1916